List of the vascular plants of Britain and Ireland #7 — this page's list covers the dicotyledon family Asteraceae. 

Status key: * indicates an introduced species and e indicates an extinct species.

Asteraceae species

References

External links
 

07